Gustavo David Sandoval (born 12 March 1975) is an Argentine former professional footballer who played as a forward.

Career
Sandoval's career started with Colón of the Argentine Primera División, with whom he made his professional debut for in December 1996 in a 6–0 win over Banfield. Six goals in thirty further appearances followed for him with Colón. In 2000, Sandoval joined fellow top-flight team Argentinos Juniors and played eight times whilst scoring one goal. A few months after joining Argentinos, he departed to sign for Chilean Primera División side Unión Española. He remained with the club until the end of 2000 and scored three goals in thirteen matches. During 2001 and 2002, Sandoval played for Jalapa in Guatemala.

In 2002, Sandoval returned to Argentine football to play for Patronato. He failed to make an appearance for the first-team and left a year after signing to join Aldosivi. After five goals in twenty games for Aldosivi, Sandoval subsequently had spells with Ben Hur, Douglas Haig and El Linqueño between 2004 and 2006 and featured in a total of thirty-two matches and scored twelve goals. In 2006, Sandoval joined Gimnasia y Esgrima in Torneo Argentino B. He retired in 2008 after eight goals in forty-two fixtures for Gimnasia y Esgrima.

Personal life
Gustavo is the father of footballer Tomás Sandoval.

Honours
Ben Hur
Torneo Argentino A: 2004–05

References

External links

1975 births
Living people
Footballers from Santa Fe, Argentina
Argentine footballers
Association football forwards
Argentine expatriate footballers
Expatriate footballers in Chile
Expatriate footballers in Guatemala
Argentine expatriate sportspeople in Chile
Argentine expatriate sportspeople in Guatemala
Argentine Primera División players
Chilean Primera División players
Liga Nacional de Fútbol de Guatemala players
Torneo Argentino A players
Torneo Argentino B players
Club Atlético Colón footballers
Argentinos Juniors footballers
Unión Española footballers
Deportivo Jalapa players
Club Atlético Patronato footballers
Aldosivi footballers
Club Sportivo Ben Hur players
Club Atlético Douglas Haig players
Club Atlético El Linqueño players
Gimnasia y Esgrima de Santa Fe players